John Victor Luce (21 May 1920 – 11 February 2011) was an Irish classicist, former professor and emeritus Fellow of Classics at Trinity College Dublin. He was also the College's Public Orator between 1971 and 2005.

Luce entered Trinity in 1938 to read Classics, and was elected a Scholar in his first year, a highly unusual achievement. He took a double Moderatorship in Classics and Philosophy and was awarded Gold Medals for both subjects. He was Auditor of the College Classical Society in 1942–43. He was elected a Fellow of Trinity in 1948 and served as Erasmus Smith's Professor of Oratory until 1989.

John Luce was the son of Arthur Aston Luce, the longest serving fellow of TCD, nephew of Gordon Hannington Luce, the noted scholar of Burmese and Asian History and Bloomsbury group member, first cousin of Rex Warner, classicist and author of novels such as the Airodrome.

An avid sportsman in his youth represented Ireland in Hockey in the 1940s, and also played Squash and Cricket. He was a keen Chess player and played for Rathmines Chess Club in the Leinster Leagues.

Partial bibliography 
The End of Atlantis: New Light on an Old Legend, London 1969
The Quest for Ulysses (with William Bedell Stanford), London 1974
Homer and the Heroic Age, London 1975
Trinity College Dublin: The First 400 Years, Dublin 1991
An Introduction to Greek Philosophy, London 1992
Orationes Dublinienses Selectae (1971-1990), Dublin 1991
Celebrating Homer's Landscapes: Troy and Ithaca Revisited, New Haven 1999
Orationes Dublinienses Selectae II (1990-2002), Dublin 2004

References

1920 births
2011 deaths
Alumni of Trinity College Dublin
Classical scholars of Trinity College Dublin
Fellows of Trinity College Dublin
Irish classical scholars
20th-century Irish historians
21st-century Irish historians
Public orators
Scholars of ancient Greek literature
Scholars of Trinity College Dublin